The 11th National Assembly of Pakistan was the legislature of Pakistan following the 1997 general election of members of parliament (MPs) or Member of the National Assembly of Pakistan (MNA) to the National Assembly of Pakistan, the lower house of the bicameral Majlis-e-Shura. The National Assembly of Pakistan is a democratically elected body currently made up of 342 members, known as Members of the National Assembly (MNAs), of which 272 are elected directly, however the political parties are allotted 70 reserved seats for women and religious minorities in accordance with their share of the total vote.

For 11th National Assembly of Pakistan, Pakistan held general elections to choose the members of the National Assembly on February 3, 1997. After President Farooq Leghari ousted the previous PPP government over issues of national security, elections were held.

The Pakistan Muslim League(N), which at the time garnered the most votes ever obtained by an opposition party, won by a landslide 2/3 as a result. For the first time, the PML-N won an election on its own without forming an alliance. After that, Nawaz Sharif was elected to a second non-consecutive term as prime minister. In the meantime, Benazir Bhutto's declining popularity caused the Pakistan People Party to be completely defeated, losing 71 seats and winning only 18. There was only a 36.0% voter turnout.

After formation of government, the National Assembly of Pakistan was elected Ellahi Bukhsh Soomro for the Speaker of National Assembly of Pakistan from 16 February 1997 to 20 August 2001.

Members 
Note: Below are the election constituencies of 1997 general election and do not link with latest election constituencies as they are completely changed.

Membership changes

See also 

 List of members of the 1st National Assembly of Pakistan
 List of members of the 2nd National Assembly of Pakistan
 List of members of the 3rd National Assembly of Pakistan
 List of members of the 4th National Assembly of Pakistan
 List of members of the 5th National Assembly of Pakistan
 List of members of the 6th National Assembly of Pakistan
 List of members of the 7th National Assembly of Pakistan
 List of members of the 8th National Assembly of Pakistan
 List of members of the 9th National Assembly of Pakistan
 List of members of the 10th National Assembly of Pakistan
 List of members of the 11th National Assembly of Pakistan
 List of members of the 12th National Assembly of Pakistan
 List of members of the 13th National Assembly of Pakistan
 List of members of the 14th National Assembly of Pakistan
 List of members of the 15th National Assembly of Pakistan

Notes

References 

1997 Pakistani general election
Lists of members of the National Assembly of Pakistan by term
Pakistani MNAs 1997–1999